Mark Wilhelm Drontmann (born 26 March 1964 in The Hague) is a sailor from the Netherlands, who represented his country at the 1988 Summer Olympics in Pusan. With his younger brother Robert Drontmann as helmsman, Drontman took the 9th place in the 470 Male.

Professional life
Drontmann holds a Master’s Degree in Management and Organization at the University of Tilburg.
He worked for Oce several roles, from Business unit manager up to Vice-President of the Document Printing SBU of Océ Technologies  (1990–2010). He nowadays works as Commercial Director Europe for brandloyalty, 's-Hertogenbosch.

Sources
 
 
 
 
 
 
 

Living people
1964 births
Sportspeople from The Hague
Dutch male sailors (sport)
Sailors at the 1988 Summer Olympics – 470
Olympic sailors of the Netherlands